Oniticellini are a tribe of scarab beetles, in the true dung beetle subfamily (Scarabaeinae). Nearly all species of this tribe feed on and nest in dung, mainly that of large herbivores. Most are tunnelers; dung is buried at the ends of tunnels dug below a dropping, and used as food by both adults and larvae; others, known as dwellers (including Oniticellus and Tragiscus) make brood cavities within or just beneath the dung.

Taxonomy
The Oniticellini have been divided into three subtribes: Drepanocerina, Helictopleurina and Oniticellina, but this arrangement is still under review.

The following genera have been placed in the Oniticellini:

Afrodrepanus
Anoplodrepanus
Attavicinus
Clypeodrepanus
Cyptochirus
Drepanellus
Drepanocerus
Drepanoplatynus
Eodrepanus
Epidrepanus
Euoniticellus
Eurysternus
Helictopleurus
Heterosyphus
Ixodina
Latodrepanus
Liatongus
Nitiocellus
Oniticellus
Paraixodina
Paroniticellus
Scaptocnemis
Sinodrepanus
Sulcodrepanus
Tibiodrepanus
Tiniocellus
Tragiscus
Yvescambefortius

References

Scarabaeinae
Beetle tribes